The flag of Wales ( or , meaning 'the red dragon') consists of a red dragon passant on a green and white field.  As with many heraldic charges, the exact representation of the dragon is not standardised and many renderings exist. It is not represented in the Union Flag.

The red dragon of Wales personifies the fearlessness of the Welsh nation. Vortigern King of the Celtic Britons from Powys is interrupted whilst attempting to build a fort at Dinas Emrys. He is told by Merlin/Ambrosius to dig up two dragons beneath the castle. He discovers a red dragon representing the Celtic Britons (now Welsh) and a white dragon representing Anglo-Saxons (now English). Merlin/Ambrosius prophecises that the Celtic Britons will reclaim the island and push the Anglo-Saxons back to the sea.

As an emblem, the red dragon of Wales has been used since the reign of Cadwaladr, King of Gwynedd from around 655 AD. The Red Welsh dragon is often described as the "Red Dragon of Cadwaladr" for this reason. Historia Brittonum was written circa 828, and by this point the dragon was no longer just a military symbol but associated with a coming deliverer from the Saxons, and for the first time as a symbol of independence. It is also the first time that the colour of the dragon is verifiably given as red. Nevertheless there may well be an older attribution of red to the colour of the dragon in Y Gododdin. The story of Lludd a Llefelys in the Mabinogion settles the matter, firmly establishing the red dragon of the Celtic Britons being in opposition with the white dragon of the Saxons. Tudor colours of green and white were added by Henry VII at the Battle of Bosworth in 1485, after which it was carried in state to St Paul's Cathedral and a dragon added as a supporter of the Tudor royal arms.

It was officially recognised as the Welsh national flag in 1959. Several cities include a dragon in their flag design, including Cardiff, the Welsh capital.

Symbolism
Historia Brittonum was written circa 828, and by this point the dragon was no longer just a military symbol but associated with a coming deliverer from the Saxons, and for the first time as a symbol of independence. It is also the first time that the colour of the dragon is verifiably given as red. Nevertheless there may well be an older attribution of red to the colour of the dragon in Y Gododdin. The story of Lludd a Llefelys in the Mabinogion settles the matter, firmly establishing the red dragon of the Celtic Britons being in opposition with the white dragon of the Saxons.

The dragon of Wales was used by numerous Welsh rulers as a propaganda tool; to portray their links to the Arthurian legend, the title given to such rulers is Y Mab Darogan (The prophesied Son). The Welsh term  was used to refer to Welsh leaders including Owain Gwynedd, Llywelyn ap Gruffudd (Llywelyn the Last) and "the dragon" Owain Glyndŵr. Cynddelw Brydydd Mawr, a court poet to Owain Gwynedd refers to him in one elegy, personifying him as "The golden dragon of Snowdonia of eagles".

Henry VII recognised the red dragon upon its blessing at Saint Paul's Cathedral following his victory at Bosworth Field under the realm of 'England and Wales' in 1485, the United Kingdom would not recognise the flag's official status again until 1959, despite the dragon being used by Romanised Celtic Britons since at least the fall of the Roman empire in 6th century AD.

History

Cadwaladr 
As an emblem, the red dragon of Wales has been used since the reign of Cadwaladr, King of Gwynedd from around 655AD. The Red Welsh dragon is often described as the "Red Dragon of Cadwaladr" for this reason. Later Taliesin poems reference the return of Cadwaladr (r. circa 655 to 682) and coming Saxon liberation.

Kingdom of Gwynedd 

The Senior line of the House of Aberffraw descended from Prince Llywelyn the Great in patriline succession and became extinct on the death of Owain Lawgoch in 1378.

Owain Glyndŵr 

In 1400,  raised the dragon standard during his revolts against the occupation of Wales by the English crown. The flag has ancient origins,  chose to fly the standard of a golden dragon on a white background, the traditional standard.

Henry VII 

In 1485, the most significant link between the symbol of the red dragon and Wales occurred when Henry Tudor flew the red dragon of Cadwaladr during his invasion of England. Henry was of Welsh descent and after leaving France with an army of 2,000, landed at Milford Haven on 7 August. He made capital of his Welsh ancestry in gathering support and gaining safe passage through Wales. Henry met and fought Richard III at the Battle of Bosworth Field, and in victory took the English throne. After the battle, Henry carried the red dragon standard in state to St Paul's Cathedral, and later the Tudor livery of green and white was added to the flag.

Modern flag
The badge was the basis of a flag of Wales in which it was placed on a horizontal white and green bicolour. However, the flag was the subject of derision, both because the tail pointed downwards in some iterations and because the motto was a potential double entendre, used in the original poem to allude to the penis of a copulating bull.

In 2017 the Unicode Consortium approved emoji support for the Flag of Wales following a proposal from Jeremy Burge of Emojipedia and Owen Williams of BBC Wales in 2016. This was added to major smartphone platforms alongside the flags of England and Scotland in the same year. Prior to this update, The Telegraph reported that users had "been able to send emojis of the Union Flag, but not of the individual nations".

Other flags

Flag of Saint David

The flag of Saint David, a yellow cross on a black field, is used in the emblem of the Diocese of St Davids and is flown on St David's Day. In recent times the flag has been adopted as a symbol of Welsh nationalism.

Government ensign

An ensign for use aboard ships used by the Welsh Government, such as the patrol boats of the Marine and Fisheries Division, was granted in 2017.

In popular culture
The flag of Wales has been used by those in the arts, sport and business to show a sense of patriotism or recognition with Wales. During the 1999 Rugby World Cup, which was hosted in Wales, the opening ceremony used the motif of the dragon several times, though most memorably, the flag was worn on a dress by Welsh singer Shirley Bassey.

Other musicians to have used the flag, include Nicky Wire of Manic Street Preachers, who will often drape the Welsh flag over amps when playing live, and Cerys Matthews who has worn the image on her clothes, while classical singer Katherine Jenkins has taken the flag on stage during live performances.

Former Pink Floyd bassist, Roger Waters's album Radio K.A.O.S. (1987) follows the story of a young disabled Welsh man, grounded in California, who regularly expresses nostalgia and a hope for return to his home country. The chorus of "Sunset Strip" uses the imagery of the flag of Wales to further emphasise this:

In 2018, the flag made an unexpected appearance in Black Panther, during a scene set in the United Nations. The flag is displayed alongside those of independent sovereign nations, leading to speculation that Wales is an independent nation in the Marvel Cinematic Universe. The scene led to comments and discussions, including from the Welsh Government and Plaid Cymru.

See also

 Campaigns for a new UK flag
 List of flags of the United Kingdom
 List of Welsh flags
 National symbols of Wales
 Flags of Europe

References

Bibliography

Flag of Wales
 
Welsh heraldry
Flags of the United Kingdom
Welsh mythology
Flags introduced in 1959
National flags
Dragons in art
Flags displaying animals